Bhiksu can refer to:

 Bhikshu (Jain monk) (1726–1803), founder of the Svetambar Terapanth sect of Jainism
 Bhikṣu, Sanskrit for Bhikkhu, a Buddhist monk
 A monk who accepted Sannyasa, a Hindu renunciate
 Bhiksu University of Sri Lanka, in Anuradhapura, Sri Lanka